Iman Rezai (born 1981 in Shiraz, Iran) is an artist currently living and working in Berlin, Germany.

In March 2012, Rezai attracted international attention for his conceptual artwork "Die Guillotine" (German for: The Guillotine)

Early life 

Rezai began his artistic career at art school in Tehran, studying in Tokyo and London before moving to Berlin where he became a masters student at the University of Arts in the class of Leiko Ikemura from 2006 to 2012. In January 2015, his brother Ardavan Rezai published the autobiographical book "We are all mouses" (original German title "Wir sind alle Mäuse") that releases insights of the childhood of the two brothers and their migration to Berlin

Art

Die Guillotine 

In 2012, Iman Rezai and Rouven Materne, who were at this time master students at the Berlin University of Arts, have built an execution instrument and started a public vote concerning the killing of a sheep to assess and represent the current state of democracy. The construction of the machine and the literature surrounding the life or death of the sheep was already met with resistance at the University whilst still in its planning stage. In a democratic vote, with rules established by the artists, the public could decide whether a sheep will be executed by a colourful instrument of death devised by him. Over a period of four weeks 4.2 million people voted from all over the globe and over 500 different international media reported on the uproar.

Cyber War 2012 

Using the email address of the New National Gallery Berlin, Iman Rezai invited guests to the fictional exhibition named "The performative post-modern as an expression of modern austerity in the age of precarity."

With "BundesInvest", Rezai demonstrated how easy it is to establish a company that appears to specialise in the sale of nuclear waste.

Waterboarding 2012 

With his performance "Waterboarding" as part of an exhibition, Rezai invited volunteers who could be subjected to the procedure in a rack created by him – to find out for themselves whether Waterboarding should be judged as a painful experience or merely a harmless shower.

Exhibitions 
 2012 "Illusion H2O", von Marten, Berlin
 2012 "1965,85 °C", Spinnerei, Leipzig
 2012 "Die Guillotine", Virtuell
 2012 "Licht und Schatten", Beta-Haus, Berlin
 2011 "Neu West Berlin", Berlin
 2011 "Veilchen", Uferhallen, Berlin
 2011 "Zu Gast bei Connex", Connex, Leipzig
 2011 "Bubble Projects", (NL)
 2010 "MEETING POINT", Forum Kunst und Architektur, Essen
 2010 "Artpoint", Bereznitsky Gallery, Donetsk (UA)
 2010 "Musashino Art Festival", MAU, Tokio (JP)
 2010 "No Limit", MAU, Tokio (JP)
 2010 "MEETING POINT", Kommunale Galerie Berlin, Berlin
 2010 "Dragonz, come out to play", Tapetenwerk, Leipzig
 2010 "Rough&Tough", UdK Berlin, Berlin
 2010 "Forgotten Bar II", Berlin Kreuzberg
 2010 "Kongress für Anders", Hamburg
 2010 "Forgotten Bar I", Berlin Kreuzberg
 2010 "Hands and friends II", Pels Leusden, Berlin
 2010 "Hands and friends I" UdK, Berlin
 2009 "Nacht & Nebel Neukölln", Berlin

References

External links 

 www.die-guillotine.com
 https://web.archive.org/web/20150222180306/http://www.monopol-magazin.de/artikel/20105396/Anzeigen-gegen-Kunst-Hinrichtung-von-Schaf.html
 https://www.vice.com/de/read/stufff-soll-dieses-schaf-sterben-ihr-stimmt-ab-die-guillotine-udk-rouven-materne-iman-rezal
 Reuters
 http://www.berlinartlink.com/2011/08/02/udk-rundgang-iman-rezai
 https://archive.today/20130117111040/http://de.artinfo.com/news/story/805221/der-gro%C3%9Fe-spiegel-iman-rezai-und-rouven-materne-arbeiten-mit-der-presse-ihr-guillotinenexperiment-auf
 http://www.rbb-online.de/nachrichten/kultur/2012_05/guillotine_bleibt.html
 
 http://www.focus.de/kultur/kunst/kunst-die-guillotine-fuer-1-75-millionen-euro-verkauft_aid_747558.html
 https://www.welt.de/kultur/article106312561/Muss-Schaf-Norbert-unter-der-Guillotine-sterben.html
 http://www.morgenpost.de/kultur/article106330628/Schaf-Norbert-im-Internet-vor-dem-Fallbeil-gerettet.html
 https://www.telegraph.co.uk/culture/art/art-news/9223458/German-artists-under-fire-for-guillotine-sheep-online-poll.html
 http://www.elpais.cr/frontend/noticia_detalle/10/66494
 http://www.huffingtonpost.com/2012/05/05/guillotine-lamb-sheep-germans-sold_n_1483957.html

1981 births
Living people
21st-century Iranian artists
People from Shiraz
Iranian expatriates in Germany